The 1998 Regal Welsh Open was a professional ranking snooker tournament that took place between 16 and 25 January 1998 at the Newport Leisure Centre in Newport, Wales.

Stephen Hendry was the defending champion, but he lost in the first round against Jamie Burnett.

Paul Hunter defeated John Higgins 9–5 in the final to win his first ranking title.


Main draw

Final

References

Welsh Open (snooker)
1998 in snooker
1990s in Cardiff
Welsh